Frederik Wilmann (born 17 July 1985 in Viggja) is a Norwegian former professional road bicycle racer, who rode professionally between 2005 and 2017. He is the son of Norwegian cyclist Jostein Wilmann.

Career
In 2007, Wilmann finished third in the Norwegian National Road Race Championships, behind Alexander Kristoff and Thor Hushovd. But he became the under-23 road race champion, after beating Stian Sommerseth, Edvald Boasson Hagen and Kristoff.

After riding several years with the Norwegian outfit, Wilmann signed a two-year contract with the Dutch team  in 2010. He broke off the contract in late 2010 due to dissatisfaction, and then returning to his former team, . After only one year "back home", he signed for the Danish team  in late 2011, riding together with experienced riders like Michael Rasmussen and Stefan Schumacher.

Major results

2003
 3rd Road race, National Junior Road Championships
2005
 1st Overall Grenland GP
1st Stage 1
2007
 1st  Road race, National Under-23 Road Championships
 1st Gjøvik GP
 1st Stage 1 Trøndelag GP
 3rd Road race, National Road Championships
 9th Overall Tour de l'Avenir
 9th Rund um die Hainleite
2008
 1st Stage 7 Tour de Bretagne
 2nd Sandefjord GP
 5th Time trial, National Under-23 Road Championships
2009
 1st  Overall Mi-Août Bretonne
 3rd Time trial, National Road Championships
 3rd Overall Tour Alsace
1st Stage 1
 6th Overall Paris–Corrèze
 7th Overall Istrian Spring Trophy
 7th Overall Ringerike GP
 10th Overall Le Triptyque des Monts et Châteaux
2011
 1st Rogaland GP
 5th Overall Tour of Norway
 7th Overall Cinturón a Mallorca
2015
 5th Overall Volta Ciclística Internacional do Rio Grande do Sul
 10th Hadeland GP
2016
 6th Sundvolden GP
 9th Overall Tour of China I

References

External links

Norwegian male cyclists
1985 births
Living people
People from Sør-Trøndelag
Sportspeople from Trøndelag